Mark Hunt is a MMA fighter.

Mark or Marc Hunt may also refer to:

Mark Hunt (footballer)
Mark Hunt (politician)
Marc Hunt who played Water polo at the 1993 Summer Universiade